Kanajanahalli  is a village in the southern state of Karnataka, India. It is located in the Hiriyur taluk of Chitradurga district in Karnataka.

Demographics
As of 2001 India census, Kanajanahalli had a population of 7040 with 3554 males and 3486 females.

See also
 Chitradurga
 Districts of Karnataka

References

External links
 http://Chitradurga.nic.in/

Villages in Chitradurga district